Coelia is a genus of orchids.

Coelia may also refer to:

 Coelia Concordia, a Vestal Virgin
 Coelia gens, ancient Roman family